This is a list of journalism schools in Africa.

Ethiopia
 School of Journalism and Communications Addis Ababa University

Ghana
 School of Communication Studies, University of Ghana
 Ghana Institute of Journalism
 African University College of Communications

Morocco

 ESJ-Casablanca / Ecole Supérieure de Journalisme et de Communication.

Tunisia
 ESJ Tunis / Ecole Supérieure de Journalisme
 Institut de Presse et des Sciences de l'Information 
 Ecole de journalisme et Cinéma Tunisie - Université Centrale

NIGERIA 

The Nigerian Institute of journalism.

South Africa
 Department of Journalism, Stellenbosch University
 School of Journalism and Media Studies, Rhodes University
 Department of Journalism, Tshwane University of Technology
 School of Literature, Language and Media, University of the Witwatersrand
 Center for Film & Media Studies, University of Cape Town
 Communication Studies, North-West University
 Media and Cultural Studies, University of Kwazulu-Natal
 Department of Journalism, Film and Television, University of Johannesburg
 Department of Media, Media Department  Cape Peninsula University of Technology

References

Journalism lists
Journalism schools
Journalism schools